The Star of Bethlehem is a 1912 American silent film produced by Edwin Thanhouser and Charles J. Hite, and featuring Florence La Badie, James Cruze, and William Russell. The film is a retelling of Biblical events preceding the Nativity of Jesus. Directed by Lawrence Marston, the entire film is staged as brief tableaux. With much of the original lost (only 15 minutes survive), the existing footage can be difficult to interpret as a coherent whole.

Overview
The plot follows those narratives of the Bible which lead up to the birth of Jesus Christ.  The cast was headed by Florence La Badie as Mary, James Cruze as Joseph, with William Russell as King Herod.

Cast
 Florence La Badie as Mary
 James Cruze as Micah/Joseph
 William Russell as King Herod
 Justus D. Barnes as Gaspar, a Magi
 Riley Chamberlin as Balthasar, a Magi
 Charles Horan as Melchior, a Magi
 Harry Marks as Scribe
 Lawrence Merton as Scribe
 N.S. Woods as Scribe
 David H. Thompson as Pharisee, rabbi
 Lew Woods as Pharisee, scribe
 Joseph Graybill as Roman messenger
 Carl LeViness – shepherd
 Frank Grimmer – shepherd
 Ethyle Cooke

Production notes
This film was produced by the Thanhouser Company in 1912. In later life, La Badie described her role of Mary as the favorite of her career.

Status and availability
The film was originally shot on three full reels. Today, only a one-reel edited version survives and is preserved at the BFI National Archive and the John E. Allen, Incorporated archive. The surviving footage is now in the public domain. Because no copyright number exists in the film, it is possible that it was never officially copyrighted at the time of its release.

The Star of Bethlehem was included on The Thanhouser Collection: Volumes 1, 2 and 3 DVD collection released in 2006.

See also
 List of Christmas films

References

External links
 

1912 films
1910s Christmas drama films
American Christmas drama films
American silent feature films
American black-and-white films
Films about the Nativity of Jesus
Portrayals of the Virgin Mary in film
Thanhouser Company films
Lost American films
1912 lost films
Lost drama films
Portrayals of Saint Joseph in film
1912 drama films
1910s American films
Silent American drama films